Tamás Sudár (13 July 1941 – 24 March 2021) was a Hungarian ski jumper. He competed in the individual event at the 1960 Winter Olympics.

References

External links
 

1941 births
2021 deaths
Hungarian male ski jumpers
Olympic ski jumpers of Hungary
Ski jumpers at the 1960 Winter Olympics
Skiers from Budapest
20th-century Hungarian people